Norman Springford  (born December 1944) is the former Chairman of The Ross Development Trust and former Executive Chairman of Apex Hotels.

An accountant by profession, Norman Springford, worked for the Inland Revenue and then became the owner/manager of a number of public houses, bingo halls, and the Edinburgh Playhouse.

He opened his first hotel, the Apex International Hotel, in Edinburgh in 1996. The group now own ten hotels across London, Edinburgh, Glasgow, Dundee and Bath. In 2014 relinquished his position as Chairman of the company, handing over to his son Ian.

In 2011 he was credited with saving the Princes Street Gardens ice rink. In June 2018, he was awarded the OBE for services to the Scottish tourism industry.

References

External links
Caterersearch - Norman Springford, chief executive of Apex Hotels group

Living people
1944 births
Businesspeople from Edinburgh